Otto Joachim, CQ (October 13, 1910 – July 30, 2010) was a German-born Canadian violist and composer of electronic music.

Early life and education

Joachim was born in Düsseldorf, Joachim to Jewish parents. His father was an opera singer. He trained as a violinist at Düsseldorf and at the  Rheinische Musikschule in Cologne.

Career
In 1934 Joachim left Nazi Germany (as did many Jewish composers of his time). He played in Singapore and Shanghai during the war years, opened a radio shop, and experimented with electronic instruments and accessories. He also performed occasionally in the Shanghai Municipal Symphony Orchestra and organized an orchestra to perform Jewish and other Western music.

Joachim left Shanghai at the time of the Communist takeover of China, and settled permanently in Montreal in 1949. For the next 15 years Joachim worked as a player, teacher, instrument builder and composer. He played in the Montreal Symphony Orchestra, and beginning in 1956 taught violin and viola at both the McGill Conservatory and at the Conservatoire de musique du Québec à Montréal.

In the 1950s Joachim experimented with twelve-tone music, and in 1956 composed String Quartet, an instrumental piece which combined twelve tone music with more traditional classical techniques. In 1958 he founded the Montreal Consort of Ancient Instruments, and directed it for ten years.

Since the 1960s he has concentrated on his compositions which are a mix of aleatoric and electroacoustic works. He composed a multi-channel electroacoustic work for the Canadian Pavilion, Katimavik at Expo 67 in Montreal. It was in the late-1970s that Joachim took up painting and sculpture. In 1994, he received an honorary doctorate from Concordia University, Montreal. The multi-channel electroacoustic studio in the Department of Music at Concordia University is named "The Otto Joachim Project Studio", where one of his paintings hangs.

In 1986 he was named an Honorary Member of the Canadian Electroacoustic Community, and in 1993, he was made a Knight of the National Order of Quebec.

In 2007 Joachim was presented with an Opus Tribute Award by the Conseil québécois de la musique. He died on July 30, 2010 in Montreal.

Joachim died in 2010.

Selected works 

 Concertante for violin, string orchestra and percussion (1960)
 Contrastes for orchestra (1968)
 Dialogue for viola and piano (1964)
 Expansion for flute and piano (1967)
 Music for Violin and Viola (1953)
 Nonet (1960)
 Paean for cello (1985)
 Petite œuvre for flute, viola and cello (2000)
 Quatro intermezzi for flute and guitar (1981)
 Requiem for violin, or viola, or cello solo (1976)
 Requiem in Memoriam Serge Garant for guitar solo (1976, 1986)
 String Quartet (1960)
 Twelve 12-Tone Pieces for Children for piano solo (1961)

Awards 

1969 - Grand Prix Paul-Gilson
1990 - Prix Calixa-Lavallée of the Société Saint-Jean-Baptiste
1993 - Chevalier of the Ordre national du Québec
2008 - Tribute Prize of the Conseil québécois de la musique

References

External links 
 Otto Joachim at the Canadian Music Centre
 The Montreal Gazette: Composer revitalized music in Canada

1910 births
2010 deaths
Canadian male composers
Canadian classical violists
Canadian people of German-Jewish descent
Electroacoustic music composers
Knights of the National Order of Quebec
Composers awarded knighthoods
Musicians awarded knighthoods
Jewish Canadian musicians
Jewish emigrants from Nazi Germany
German expatriates in China
Musicians from Düsseldorf
20th-century Canadian composers
20th-century Canadian male musicians
German emigrants to Canada
20th-century violists